is a Japanese kickboxer, currently competing in the bantamweight division of RISE and SNKA.

As of October 2022, he is ranked as the ninth best flyweight (-56.7kg) kickboxer in the world by Combat Press and the fifth best super flyweight (-55kg) by Beyond Kick.

Martial arts career
Ebata made his professional debut against Masamitsu Ibara at SNKA TITANS NEOS 2 on September 16, 2007. He won the fight by a first-round knockout. After winning a decision over Yuki Ueba at SNKA MAGNUM 16 on March 9, 2008, Ebata fought to a majority decision draw against Daihachi Furuoka at SNKA MAGNUM 17 on July 13, 2008. Ebata next faced Hiroki Akimoto at K-1 Koshien -KING OF UNDER 18- on August 29, 2008. He suffered his first professional loss, as Akimoto won the fight by unanimous decision.

Ebata faced Tatsuya Nanase at SNKA MAGNUM 19 on March 8, 2009. He won the fight by unanimous decision. Ebata returned to the ring a month later, as he faced Haruya Ohama at SNKA Superkick on April 5, 2009. He won the fight by a second-round knockout. Ebata notched another quick stoppage victory in his next fight, as he needed just 26 seconds to knock Lukton out at SNKA MAGNUM 20 on July 12, 2009. Ebata was booked to face Atom Tataki, in his fourth and final fight of the year, at SNKA MAGNUM 21 on October 25, 2009. He won the fight by unanimous decision, with all three judges scoring the bout 30–26 in his favor.

Mutuski was scheduled to fight Manasak Pinsinchai for the Rajadamnern Stadium Bantamweight title, during SNKA MAGNUM 31. He lost the fight by unanimous decision. After defeating Ektawan Kulunteptonburi by TKO in his next fight, he once against fought for the Rajadamnern Stadium Bantamweight belt, this time against Fonpet Chuwattana. Ebata lost the fight by a split decision. He bounced back from his second failed title bid with a TKO win over Wanchai Sitsaitong.

Ebata fought Chanaek Sor.Mantanasanchai for the inaugural WKBA World Bantamweight title during SNKA TITANS NEOS 15. He won the fight by TKO, after Chanaek's corner threw in the towel midway through the first round.

He won his next two fights, winning a unanimous decision against Fonpet Chuwattana, and knocking out Chansaknoi Sakrunruang during SNKA Soul in the Ring XII.

Mutsuki Ebata was scheduled to fight Fonpet Chuwattana. The fight was a title defense for both, as Ebata defended the WKBA World Bantamweight and Chuwattana defended the Rajadamnern Stadium Bantamweight. Chuwattana won the fight, and both of the titles, by unanimous decision.

Ebata fought Mongkonchai Sor.Mirjan for the vacant WKBA World Bantamweight title during SNKA TITANS NEOS XVIII. He beat Mirjan by a second round KO, to capture the WKBA title for the second time. 

Ebata afterwards went on a six fight winning streak, defeating Luktao Mor.Tamachat, Kaoniew Sitpuyainirun, Krunsin PetpumMuaythai and Anuchit Tamswamuaythaigym by TKO, as well as scoring a decision win over Hontonglek Chor Fanpuriansee and a split decision against Fonpet Chuwattana.

He was scheduled to defend his WKBA World Bantamweight title for the first time against Mafuenglek Chor.Nor.Patalun during SNKA TITANS NEOS 22. Ebata won the fight by a second round TKO.

After successfully defending his WKBA title, Ebata went on a 5-1-1 run. He defeated Toto PetpumMuaythai by a first round KO, Ninmongkon PetpumMuaythai by a first round TKO, KO wins over Ali Lo Petbontong and Gun Harbataijon, as well as a decision win against Petyaso Dabrunasakarm.

During SNKA MAGNUM 51, Ebata challenged Saotho Sitchefboontham for the Rajadamnern Stadium Bantamweight title. He fight was declared a draw.

He was scheduled to fight Rasta during Rizin 24, for his Rizin debut. Ebata won the fight by unanimous decision.

Ebata was scheduled to fight Kazane in the quarterfinals of the 2021 RISE Dead or Alive 53kg Tournament. He lost the fight by split decision.

Titles and accomplishments

 2010 Shin Nihon Kickboxing Association Flyweight Champion 
 2014 WKBA World Bantamweight Champion  
 2015 WKBA World Bantamweight Champion

Fight record

|-  style="text-align:center; background:#cfc"
| 2022-06-19 || Win ||align=left| Riamu || THE MATCH 2022 || Tokyo, Japan ||Ext.R Decision (Split)|| 4 || 3:00
|-  style="text-align:center; background:#fbb"
| 2022-04-02 ||Loss ||align=left| Masahiko Suzuki || RISE El Dorado 2022 || Tokyo, Japan || Decision (Unanimous) || 3 ||3:00
|-  style="text-align:center; background:#fbb;"
| 2021-07-18|| Loss ||align=left| Kazane || RISE WORLD SERIES 2021 - Dead or Alive Tournament, Quarter Final || Osaka, Japan || Ext.R Decision (Split) ||4  ||3:00 

|-  style="text-align:center; background:#cfc;"
| 2020-09-27|| Win ||align=left| Rasta || Rizin 24 - Saitama || Saitama, Japan || Decision (Unanimous) || 3 || 3:00 

|-  style="text-align:center; background:#c5d2ea;"
| 2019-10-20|| Draw||align=left| Saotho Sitchefboontham || SNKA MAGNUM 51 || Tokyo, Japan || Decision || 5 || 3:00
|-
! style=background:white colspan=9 |

|- style="text-align:center; background:#cfc;"
| 2019-07-07|| Win||align=left| Gun Harbataijon || SNKA TITANS NEOS 25 || Tokyo, Japan || KO|| 1 || 2:41

|-  style="text-align:center; background:#fbb;"
| 2019-01-23|| Loss ||align=left| Ekpipup Mor.Krunghtepthonburi || Rajadamnern Stadium|| Bangkok, Thailand || Decision || 5 || 3:00 

|- style="text-align:center; background:#cfc;"
| 2018-09-02|| Win ||align=left| Ali Lo Petbontong || SNKA TITANS NEOS 24 || Tokyo, Japan || KO (Right Low Kick) || 2 || 1:35

|- style="text-align:center; background:#cfc;"
| 2018-07-08 || Win||align=left| Petyaso Dabransarakarm|| SNKA MAGNUM 47 || Tokyo, Japan || Decision (Unanimous)|| 5 || 3:00 

|-  style="text-align:center; background:#c5d2ea;"
| 2018-05-31|| Draw||align=left| Suntos Watacharagym || Rajadamnern Stadium|| Bangkok, Thailand || Decision || 5 || 3:00 

|- style="text-align:center; background:#cfc;"
| 2018-03-11 || Win||align=left| Ninmongkon PetpumMuaythai|| SNKA MAGNUM 46 || Tokyo, Japan || TKO (Corner Stoppage)|| 1 || 1:26 

|- style="text-align:center; background:#cfc;"
| 2017-12-10 || Win||align=left| Toto PetpumMuaythai|| SNKA SOUL IN THE RING 15 || Tokyo, Japan || KO || 1 || 2:30 

|- style="text-align:center; background:#cfc;"
| 2017-09-17 || Win||align=left| Mafueanglek Chor.Nor.Patalun|| SNKA TITANS NEOS 22 || Tokyo, Japan || TKO (Corner Stoppage) || 2 || 2:25 
|-
! style=background:white colspan=9 |

|- style="text-align:center; background:#cfc;"
| 2017-04-16 || Win||align=left| Anuchit Tamswamuaythaigym|| SNKA TITANS NEOS 21 || Tokyo, Japan || TKO (Corner Stoppage) || 3 || 1:24 

|- style="text-align:center; background:#cfc;"
| 2016-12-11 || Win||align=left| Krunsin PetpumMuaythai|| SNKA SOUL IN THE RING XIV || Tokyo, Japan || TKO (Corner Stoppage) || 2 || 2:43 

|- style="text-align:center; background:#cfc;"
| 2016-09-18 || Win||align=left| Hongtonglek Chor Fanpuriansee|| SNKA TITANS NEOS 20 || Tokyo, Japan || Decision (Unanimous) || 5 || 3:00 

|-  style="text-align:center; background:#cfc;"
| 2016-07-27|| Win ||align=left| Kaoniew Sitpuyainirun || Rajadamnern Stadium|| Bangkok, Thailand || TKO || 3 ||  

|- style="text-align:center; background:#cfc;"
| 2016-04-17 || Win||align=left| Fonpet Chuwattana|| SNKA TITANS NEOS XIX || Tokyo, Japan || Decision (Split) || 5 || 3:00 

|- style="text-align:center; background:#cfc;"
| 2015-12-13 || Win||align=left| Luktao Mor.Tamachat || SNKA SOUL IN THE RING 13 || Tokyo, Japan || KO  || 2 || 3:00 

|- style="text-align:center; background:#cfc;"
| 2015-09-20 || Win||align=left| Mongkonchai Sor.Mirchan || SNKA TITANS NEOS XVIII || Tokyo, Japan || KO (Left Hook) || 1 || 1:53 
|-
! style=background:white colspan=9 |

|-  style="text-align:center; background:#fbb;"
| 2015-03-15 || Loss ||align=left| Fonpet Chuwattana || SNKA MAGNUM 37 || Tokyo, Japan || Decision (Unanimous) || 5 || 3:00 
|-
! style=background:white colspan=9 |

|- style="text-align:center; background:#cfc;"
| 2014-12-14 || Win||align=left| Chansaknoi Sakrunruang || SNKA Soul in the Ring XII || Tokyo, Japan || KO  || 1 || 1:58 

|- style="text-align:center; background:#cfc;"
| 2014-09-13 || Win||align=left| Fonpet Chuwattana || SNKA TITANS NEOS XVI || Tokyo, Japan || Decision (Unanimous) || 5 || 3:00 

|- style="text-align:center; background:#cfc;"
| 2014-04-20 || Win||align=left| Chanaek Sor.Mantanasanchai|| SNKA TITANS NEOS 15 || Tokyo, Japan || TKO (Corner Stroppage) || 1 || 1:36 
|-
! style=background:white colspan=9 |

|- style="text-align:center; background:#cfc;"
| 2013-12-08 || Win||align=left| Wanchai Sitsaitong|| SNKA SOUL IN THE RING VI || Tokyo, Japan || TKO || 2 || 1:37 

|-  style="text-align:center; background:#fbb;"
| 2013-09-16 || Loss ||align=left| Fonpet Chuwattana || SNKA TITANS NEOS XIV  || Tokyo, Japan || Decision (Split) || 5 || 3:00 
|-
! style=background:white colspan=9 |

|- style="text-align:center; background:#cfc;"
| 2013-07-21 || Win||align=left| Ektawan Mor.Krugnthepthonburi || SNKA MAGNUM 32 || Tokyo, Japan || TKO (Punches) || 2 || 1:15 

|-  style="text-align:center; background:#fbb;"
| 2013-03-10 || Loss||align=left| Manasak Pinsinchai || SNKA MAGNUM 31 || Tokyo, Japan || Decision (Unanimous) || 5 || 3:00 
|-
! style=background:white colspan=9 |

|- style="text-align:center; background:#cfc;"
| 2012-12-31 || Win||align=left| Kim Sangjae || Dream 18/Glory 4: Tokyo || Saitama, Japan || Decision (Unanimous) || 3 || 3:00 

|- style="text-align:center; background:#cfc;"
| 2012-09-15 || Win||align=left| Jompet Chuwattana || SNKA TITANS NEOS 12 || Tokyo, Japan || TKO || 1 || 2:21 

|- style="text-align:center; background:#cfc;"
| 2012-07-22 || Win||align=left| Arashi Fujihara || SNKA MAGNUM 29 || Tokyo, Japan || TKO (3 Knockdowns/Elbows) || 1 || 2:36 

|- style="text-align:center; background:#cfc;"
| 2012-04-22 || Win||align=left| Somtamuisan Acegym || SNKA TITANS NEOS 11 || Tokyo, Japan || TKO || 3 || 2:55 

|- style="text-align:center; background:#cfc;"
| 2011-12-17 || Win||align=left| Taharnek Paradongym || SNKA SOUL IN THE RING IX || Tokyo, Japan || KO || 2 || 2:50 

|- style="text-align:center; background:#cfc;"
| 2011-09-04 || Win||align=left| Takuya Takahashi || SNKA TITANS NEOS X || Tokyo, Japan || KO || 1 || 2:24 

|- style="text-align:center; background:#cfc;"
| 2011-07-04 || Win||align=left| Hiroki Koshikawa || SNKA MAGNUM 26 || Tokyo, Japan || KO (Straight Right) || 1 || 1:10 
|-
! style=background:white colspan=9 |

|- style="text-align:center; background:#cfc;"
| 2011-04-17 || Win||align=left| Masanori Matsuzaki || SNKA TITANS NEOS IX || Tokyo, Japan || TKO (Doctor Stoppage)|| 1 || 0:49 

|-  style="text-align:center; background:#fbb;"
| 2010-12-30 || Loss ||align=left| Arashi Fujihara || World Victory Road Presents: Soul of Fight || Tokyo, Japan || Decision (Unanimous) || 5 || 3:00

|- style="text-align:center; background:#cfc;"
| 2010-10-24 || Win||align=left| Gatten Furukawa|| SNKA MAGNUM 24 || Tokyo, Japan || TKO (Doctor Stoppage)|| 1 || 2:08 

|- style="text-align:center; background:#cfc;"
| 2010-07-25 || Win||align=left| Fonpet Chuwattana|| SNKA MAGNUM 23 || Tokyo, Japan || Decision (Unanimous) || 3 || 3:00 

|- style="text-align:center; background:#cfc;"
| 2010-03-07 || Win||align=left| Hiroki Koshikawa || SNKA MAGNUM 22 || Tokyo, Japan || Decision (Unanimous) || 5 || 3:00 
|-
! style=background:white colspan=9 |

|- style="text-align:center; background:#cfc;"
| 2009-10-25 || Win||align=left| Atom Tataki || SNKA MAGNUM 21 || Tokyo, Japan || Decision (Unanimous) || 3 || 3:00 

|- style="text-align:center; background:#cfc;"
| 2009-07-12 || Win||align=left| Lukton || SNKA MAGNUM 20 || Tokyo, Japan || KO || 1 || 0:26 

|- style="text-align:center; background:#cfc;"
| 2009-04-05 || Win||align=left| Haruya Ohama|| SNKA Superkick || Tokyo, Japan || KO || 2 || 1:05 

|- style="text-align:center; background:#cfc;"
| 2009-03-08 || Win||align=left| Tatsuya Nanase || SNKA MAGNUM 19|| Tokyo, Japan || Decision (Unanimous) || 3 || 3:00 

|- style="text-align:center; background:#cfc;"
| 2008-12-14 || Win||align=left| Masanori Usui || SNKA SOUL IN THE RING VI|| Tokyo, Japan || KO  || 1 || 0:55 

|- style="text-align:center; background:#fbb;"
| 2008-08-29|| Loss ||align=left| Hiroki Akimoto || K-1 Koshien -KING OF UNDER 18-  || Tokyo, Japan || Decision (Unanimous) || 3 || 3:00 

|- style="text-align:center; background:#c5d2ea;"
| 2008-07-13|| Draw||align=left| Daihachi Furuoka || SNKA MAGNUM 17 || Tokyo, Japan || Decision || 3 || 3:00 

|- style="text-align:center; background:#cfc;"
| 2008-03-09 || Win||align=left| Yuki Ueba || SNKA MAGNUM 16|| Tokyo, Japan || Decision (Majority) || 2 || 3:00 

|- style="text-align:center; background:#cfc;"
| 2007-09-16 || Win||align=left| Masamitsu Ibara || SNKA TITANS NEOS 2|| Tokyo, Japan || KO (Straight Right) || 1 || 1:22 
|-
| colspan=9 | Legend:

See also
List of male kickboxers

References

Living people
1991 births
Flyweight kickboxers
People from Tsuchiura
Sportspeople from Ibaraki Prefecture